The following highways are numbered 17E:

United States
 Nebraska Link 17E
 New York State Route 17E (former)

See also
List of highways numbered 17